Arsaki is the name of two rural localities in Slednevskoye Rural Settlement, Alexandrovsky District, Vladimir Oblast, Russia:

Arsaki (hamlet), Vladimir Oblast, a hamlet
Arsaki (settlement), Vladimir Oblast, a settlement